Kimberton is an unincorporated community and census-designated place in East Pikeland Township in Chester County, Pennsylvania, United States. The zip code is 19442. Originally settled in the late 18th century, it was not named until 1817. Like many surrounding villages, Kimberton developed around a tavern; in this case, the tavern was called Chrisman's. In 1796, the Chrisman's Mill began operating, drawing activity to the tiny village. It operated until 1938 and is currently the town's post office. As of 2020, the CDP has a population of 568.

Kimberton is located at  (40.130N, -75.572W). The elevation is 207 feet.

Notable residents
 John S. D. Eisenhower (son of former United States President Dwight D. Eisenhower)
 Esther J. Trimble Lippincott (1838–1888), American educator, reformer, author
 M. C. Richards artist and spirituality author and teacher

References

External links

 Kimberton Fire Company
 Kimberton Waldorf School
 Kimberton Whole Foods
Kimberton CSA

Unincorporated communities in Chester County, Pennsylvania
Unincorporated communities in Pennsylvania